Rana Muhammad Shamim is a former Pakistani chief judge who served as chief judge of the Appellate court of the Supreme Appellate Court Gilgit-Baltistan from August 2015 to 2018. He has also been the Chief Justice of Sindh High Court.

References

Living people
Chief Justices of the Sindh High Court
Year of birth missing (living people)